An den zwei Steinen is a mountain, in the Idar Forest (part of the Hunsrück mountains) in the counties of Birkenfeld and Bernkastel-Wittlich in Rhineland-Palatinate, Germany.

The wooded peak is the second-highest in Rhineland-Palatinate after the Erbeskopf (816.3 m), 15 kilometres to the southwest (with its southwestern spur, the Springenkopf, 784.2 m) in the Schwarzwälder Hochwald, and ahead of the Kahlheid (766.0 m), 12 kilometres southwest, also in the Idar Forest.

Its summit lies on the boundary of Stipshausen to the northeast, Hottenbach to the east-southeast and Hinzerath (part of Morbach) to the northwest; other municipalities nearby are: Hochscheid to the north and Hellertshausen to the southeast.

The Landesstraße 159 between Hinzerath and nearby Bruchweiler runs past the mountain to the southwest. The road from Hinzerath to Hellertshausen (Kreisstraßen 125 and 56) branches off the L 159 and runs over the southern flank of the mountain.

See also 
 List of mountains and hills of Rhineland-Palatinate

References 

Mountains under 1000 metres
Mountains and hills of Rhineland-Palatinate
Mountains and hills of the Hunsrück
Birkenfeld (district)
Bernkastel-Wittlich